Grace Elizabeth Ann Potts (born 12 July 2002) is an English cricketer who currently plays for Staffordshire, Central Sparks and Manchester Originals. She plays as a right-arm medium bowler.

Domestic career
Potts played cricket at Newcastle-under-Lyme School. She made her county debut in 2018, for Staffordshire against Leicestershire. That season, she took 3 wickets at an average of 21.66 in the County Championship and 4 wickets at an average of 28.75 in the Twenty20 Cup. The following season, Potts was part of the Staffordshire side that won Division 3A in the County Championship and Division 3C in the 2019 Women's Twenty20 Cup. She took four wickets at an average of 25.50 for the side in the 2022 Women's Twenty20 Cup.

In 2020, Potts was named in the Central Sparks squad for the Rachael Heyhoe Flint Trophy, but did not play a match. She was retained in the squad for the 2021 season, and made her debut for the side on 30 August 2021, against South East Stars in the Charlotte Edwards Cup, in which she took 2/23 from her 3 overs. In 2022, she was Central Sparks' leading wicket-taker in both the Charlotte Edwards Cup and the Rachael Heyhoe Flint Trophy, with 12 and 10 wickets respectively. She took her Twenty20 best bowling figures in a match against South East Stars, with 4/36. She also signed for Manchester Originals in The Hundred, playing five matches. In January 2023, it was announced that Potts had signed her first professional contract with Central Sparks.

References

External links

2002 births
Living people
Place of birth missing (living people)
Staffordshire women cricketers
Central Sparks cricketers
Manchester Originals cricketers
People educated at Newcastle-under-Lyme School